Amara coelebs is a species of beetle of the genus Amara in the family Carabidae.

References

coelebs
Beetles described in 1908